Doctor Faustus is a 1982 West German drama film directed by Franz Seitz, based on the 1947 novel by Thomas Mann. It was entered into the 13th Moscow International Film Festival where it won the Silver Prize.

Cast

References

External links
 

1982 films
1982 drama films
1980s fantasy drama films
German fantasy drama films
West German films
1980s German-language films
Films based on German novels
Films based on works by Thomas Mann
Films set in the 1900s
Films set in the 1910s
Films set in the 1920s
Films set in the 1930s
Films about classical music and musicians
Films about composers
Works based on the Faust legend
1980s German films